Whitehill Junction railway station is a former railway station, on the Longmoor Military Railway, which was closed along with the rest of the line in 1969. The station served the village of Whitehill, Hampshire. The station was featured in the films The Great St Trinian's Train Robbery.

See also 
 List of closed railway stations in Britain

References 

Disused railway stations in Hampshire
Former Longmoor Military Railway stations